, son of Kanetada and adopted son of Mototada, was kugyo or highest-ranking Japanese court noble of the Kamakura period (1185–1333). Morohira was his son. Fuyunori was his adopted son. He held court positions as follows:
 Sessho (1308–1311)
 Daijō Daijin (1310–1311)
 Kampaku (1311–1313)
 Kampaku (1315–1316)
 Daijō Daijin 1323-1327
 Kampaku (1324–1327)

References
 https://web.archive.org/web/20070927231943/http://nekhet.ddo.jp/people/japan/fstakatukasa.html

See also
 Kasuga Gongen Genki E

1275 births
1327 deaths
Fujiwara clan
Takatsukasa family
People of Kamakura-period Japan